Foreign relations exist between Austria and Ukraine. Both countries established diplomatic relations in 1992. The Treaty of Brest-Litovsk in 1918 became the first major international document with the Austrian nation.

Historically, a big portion of West Ukraine (Galicia, Carpathia and Northern Bukovina) were part of the Austro-Hungarian Empire, today consisting of: Lviv Oblast, Ivano-Frankivsk Oblast, Ternopil Oblast, Chernivtsi Oblast and Zakarpattia Oblast. During World War I Ukraine was occupied by the Central powers military force (including the Austrian military) that drove Bolsheviks out of the country.

Austria has an embassy in Kyiv and 3 honorary consulates (in Donetsk, Kharkiv and Lviv). Ukraine has an embassy in Vienna and 2 honorary consulates (in Klagenfurt and Salzburg).

In October 1998, the President of Ukraine Leonid Kuchma paid a state visit to Austria.
In May 2000, the President of Austria Thomas Klestil paid a state visit to Ukraine.

Embassies 
The Embassy of Austria is located in Kyiv, Ukraine. The Embassy of Ukraine is located in Vienna, Austria.

See also 
 Foreign relations of Austria
 Foreign relations of Ukraine
 Ukrainians in Austria

Notes and references

External links 
  Austrian Foreign Ministry: list of bilateral treaties with Ukraine (in German only)
  Austrian embassy in Kyiv (in German and Ukrainian only)
  Ukrainian embassy in Vienna

 
Ukraine
Bilateral relations of Ukraine